The ČSD Class T 466.2/3, later ČD and ZSSK class 742/3, are a class of diesel locomotives, constructed by ČKD Praha between 1977 and 1986.

History 
The locomotive was developed from the ČSD Class T 448.0 shunting locomotive, modified to be more suited to ČSD's needs, including a higher top speed, lower axle loads, and the relevant signalling equipment.

The first series of 60 locomotives started to be delivered in 1977, and were allocated to depots at Bratislava, Leopoldov, Bohumín, Děčín, Trutnov, Plzeň, Ostrava, Hradec Králové, Liberec, and Ústí nad Labem. In total 494 locomotives were built, of which 438 went to the Czechoslovak State Railways

One of the locomotives, T466.2037, was the 1000th locomotive produced by ČKD Praha.

External links

References 

Diesel-electric locomotives of Czechoslovakia
Diesel-electric locomotives of the Czech Republic
Diesel-electric locomotives of Slovakia
Railway locomotives introduced in 1977
Bo′Bo′ locomotives